Greatest Hits is a compilation album by English band The Style Council, released in 2000 eleven years after their split. It was re-released 14 April 2003.

It is the band's second greatest hits album, eleven years after The Singular Adventures of The Style Council. Greatest Hits differs from the latter being in chronological order, and with the addition of "Come to Milton Keynes" and double A-side "The Big Boss Groove".

Both albums feature a photograph of the band showing all four members which was taken in 1987. The US version of The Cost of Loving and the rarities compilation Here's Some That Got Away also feature photographs from this session.

Track listing
All tracks written by Paul Weller, except where noted.

Charts

Certifications

References

The Style Council albums
2000 greatest hits albums
Polydor Records compilation albums